Etch A Sketch is a mechanical drawing toy invented by André Cassagnes of France and subsequently manufactured by the Ohio Art Company. It is now owned by Spin Master of Toronto, Ontario, Canada.

An Etch A Sketch has a thick, flat gray screen in a red plastic frame. There are two white knobs on the front of the frame in the lower corners. Twisting the knobs moves a stylus that displaces aluminum powder on the back of the screen, leaving a solid line. The knobs create lineographic images. The left control moves the stylus horizontally, and the right one moves it vertically.

The Etch A Sketch was introduced near the peak of the Baby Boom on 12 July 1960 for $2.99. It went on to sell 600,000 units that year and is one of the best known toys of that era. In 1998, it was inducted into the National Toy Hall of Fame at The Strong, in Rochester, New York. In 2003, the Toy Industry Association named Etch A Sketch one of the 100 most memorable toys of the 20th century. The Etch A Sketch has since sold over 100 million units worldwide.

Mechanics
The toy is a kind of plotter. The inside surface of the glass screen is coated with aluminium powder, which is then scraped off by a movable stylus, leaving a dark line on the light gray screen. The stylus is controlled by the two large knobs, one of which moves it vertically and the other horizontally. Turning both knobs simultaneously makes diagonal lines. To erase the picture, the user turns the toy upside down and shakes it. Doing this causes polystyrene beads to smooth out and re-coat the inside surface of the screen with aluminum powder. The "black" line merely exposes the darkness inside the toy. Scraping out large "black" areas allows enough light through to expose parts of the interior.

History

The Etch A Sketch toy was invented in the late 1950s by André Cassagnes, an electrician with Lincrusta Co, who named the toy L'Écran Magique (The Magic Screen). In 1959, he took his drawing toy to the International Toy Fair in Nuremberg, Germany. The Ohio Art Company saw it but had no interest in the toy. When Ohio Art saw the toy a second time, they decided to take a chance on the product. L'Écran Magique was soon renamed the Etch A Sketch and became the most popular drawing toy in the business. After a complex series of negotiations, the Ohio Art Company launched the toy in the United States in time for the 1960 Christmas season with the name "Etch A Sketch". Ohio Art supported the toy with a televised advertising campaign.

Originally, the toy used a plate glass screen, which was criticized by safety advocates for being easily broken and a danger to children. In November 1970, Consumers Union filed a petition with the Department of Health, Education and Welfare, asking for emergency action under the 1969 Child Protection and Toy Safety Act. The Food and Drug Administration responded that the toy had been redesigned, replacing the glass plate with plastic.

The Etch A Sketch toy was featured in the 1995 Disney/Pixar animated film Toy Story, in a scene where a sentient one performs a "quick draw" duel with Sheriff Woody. This 12-second feature had been enough to give a significant sales boost, requiring the production line to work overtime to meet demand. By 1999, the company had again fallen into severe financial trouble from canceled orders of various products, reaching a point where the solvency of the company was in question. However, the company recovered with the prudent decision to agree to again have an Etch A Sketch appear in an animated feature film – this time in 1999 sequel Toy Story 2. This scene featured an Etch A Sketch being used to present sketches related to the investigation of Sheriff Woody's kidnapping by Al McWhiggin the toy collector and the owner of Al's Toy Barn. At 45 seconds, the scene in question was much longer than the scene in the original movie. The exposure from the highly successful Pixar movie resulted in sales of the toy increasing by 20 percent and ensured the survival of the company.

Etch A Sketch was manufactured in Bryan, Ohio until the company moved the manufacturing plant to Shenzhen, China in 2001.

In France, its country of origin, Etch A Sketch was sold under the name of "Télécran", rather than L'Écran Magique.

In February 2016, the rights to the Etch A Sketch name and design were acquired by Toronto-based Spin Master Corporation.

Etch A Sketch Animator

The Etch A Sketch Animator (known simply as "The Animator" in Canada and Europe), debuted in 1986, and featured a 40x30 dot matrix display and used two knobs for drawing, like a regular Etch A Sketch, with several buttons to manipulate the drawings. It had two kilobytes of memory, capable of storing 12 frames of pictures in any combination up to 96 times. It contained a speaker, which made static-like sounds when the knobs were moved and during animations.

Etch A Sketch Animator 2000

With the return of the home video game market in the mid 80s and the relative success of the Etch A Sketch Animator, Ohio Art decided to release a high-tech sequel to the Animator, known as the Animator 2000. The unit itself doesn't resemble a traditional Etch A Sketch at all: The classic knobs are replaced with "The Magic Touchpad", the system's form-factor resembles a laptop computer, and the unit features a large 6040 LCD screen. The unit contains 196KB of "powerful computer memory" which is a significant upgrade over the roughly 2KB of the original Animator. This memory upgrade allowed the system to have 22 frames in which to store drawings, and these frames could be animated in sequence up to 99 times. This memory upgrade combined with the relatively powerful custom processor was also important since the Animator 2000 was designed to be a portable entertainment/games system instead of simply an electronic drawing toy. The unit features a cartridge slot, and four cartridges were available: "Fly By", a flight simulator game; "Overdrive", a road racing game; "Putt-Nuts", a miniature golf game; and "Memory", a memory expansion cartridge.

Etch A Sketch Color

In 1993, Ohio launched a color Etch A Sketch. Similar to the original Etch A Sketch, it used the traditional two-knob interface to draw, but also featured six colors. It also had the ability to produce a color copy of each picture drawn.

Etch A Sketch ETO – Plug and Play Drawing System / Etch A Sketch Wired

These are basically hand-held controllers that connect to a television-like handheld TV games and work like a regular Etch A Sketch, except on the television screen and with the addition of colors and sound effects.

Etch A Sketch art
There are a few practicing artists who use the Etch A Sketch to produce professional lineographic work. The artists make their work permanent by removing the aluminum powder. This is done either by drilling holes in the bottom of the toy or by removing the entire plastic backing. It is then resealed as a permanent, shake-resistant piece of art.

See also
 Magna Doodle, a somewhat similar toy using a different principle of operation.
 Etch-a-sketch gaffe during the 2012 Mitt Romney presidential campaign.

References

External links

Official Ohio Art Company Etch A Sketch website

Video looking at the chemistry of the Etch-a-Sketch powder inside

Art and craft toys
Products introduced in 1960
1960s toys
1970s toys
1980s toys
1990s toys
2000s toys
2010s toys
2020s toys
French inventions